The 2019–20 Lipscomb Bisons men's basketball team represents Lipscomb University in the 2019–20 NCAA Division I men's basketball season. The Bisons, led by first-year head coach Lennie Acuff, play their home games at the Allen Arena in Nashville, Tennessee as members of the Atlantic Sun Conference.

Previous season
The Bisons finished the 2018–19 season 29–8 overall, 14–2 in ASUN play to finish as regular season co-champions, along with Liberty. In the ASUN tournament, they defeated Kennesaw State in the quarterfinals, NJIT in the semifinals, before losing to Liberty in the championship game. As a regular season league champion who failed to win their league tournament, they received an automatic bid to the NIT, where they made it all the way to the championship game, before losing to Texas.

On April 10, 2019, head coach Casey Alexander announced that he would be stepping down, in order to take the head coaching job at Belmont. On April 24, 2019, Lennie Acuff was announced as the next head coach.

Roster

Schedule and results

|-
!colspan=12 style=| Non-conference regular season

|-
!colspan=9 style=| Atlantic Sun Conference regular season

|-
!colspan=12 style=| Atlantic Sun tournament
|-

Source

References

Lipscomb Bisons men's basketball seasons
Lipscomb Bisons
Lipscomb Bisons men's basketball
Lipscomb Bisons men's basketball